Nyah is a town in northern Victoria, Australia.

The town, on the banks of the Murray River was formed as the "Taverner Community Village Settlement" in the 1890s by Jim Thwaites as a utopian socialist community, one of many established along the Murray, including Waikerie in South Australia.  The communities were established in imitation of the New Australia settlement of William Lane in Paraguay. Lack of access to water for fields and a falling-out of favour of socialism led to the end of state support for these communities.

The Post Office opened on 4 May 1894 (though known as Tyntynder for some months).

The Nyah State School was established in 1896 when classes were first held in the town's Top Hall. A school was built in 1912, which had been thrice extended by the end of the 1960s. In 1997, Nyah Primary School amalgamated with Nyah West Primary school to create the Nyah District Primary School.

The town in conjunction with neighbouring township Nyah West (after a merger of the Nyah and Nyah West football clubs) has an Australian Rules football team competing in the Central Murray Football League known as Nyah-Nyah West United.

Nyah Harness Racing Club conducts regular meetings at its racetrack in the town.

Golfers play at the course of the Nyah District Golf Club on the Murray Valley Highway.

Gallery

Climate

References

External links

Towns in Victoria (Australia)
Rural City of Swan Hill

Populated places on the Murray River